Bharatpur is a city in southern central Nepal. It is the third most populous city of Nepal after Kathmandu and Pokhara with  369,377 inhabitants in 2021. It is also the second largest metropolitan city in Nepal by area. It is the district headquarter of the Chitwan District.

Bharatpur is one of the fastest-growing cities in Nepal. It lies on the western bank of the Narayani River and serves as a commercial center of the Chitwan district and the central region of Nepal. Most of the shopping area lies in the area of Narayangadh, while government offices, hospitals and colleges are situated in other parts of the city, including Nepal's premier cancer hospital, B.P Koirala Memorial Cancer Hospital.

In March 2017, Bharatpur was declared a metropolitan city after Narayani Municipality, Chitrawan Municipality and Kabilas Village were merged into it.

Economy 

The economy of Bharatpur is traditionally based on agriculture. The city also holds a small-scale processing industry that mostly processes the food surpluses of the Chitwan district. Their products are sold to major cities of Nepal, Kathmandu and Pokhara.

The poultry industry is expanding in the municipality, producing a significant amount of poultry products for the country, and is one of the main employment sources in the Chitwan District.

Other products from the city include honey, mushrooms, and flowers. A significant part of its economy is derived from education and health services.

Demographics

Ethnic groups 

The largest ethnic group in the city are Khas consisting (Hill Brahman, Chhetri, Kami, Damai, Thakuri, sarki etc) makes 53% of the population, other ethnic groups includes Gurung (10%), Tamang (6%), Newar (6%), Tharu (6%), Magar (5%), other various small ethnic groups makes 14% of the population.

Languages 

At the time of the 2011 Census of Nepal, 78% of the population in the city spoke Nepali, 5% Tharu, 4% Gurung, 4% Tamang, 2% Newari, 2% Magar, and 6% spoke other smaller languages as their first language.

Tourist attractions

Bishazari Tal

Bishazari Tal, meaning "twenty thousand lakes", is in south Bharatpur. The lake serves as a bird watching center and houses many crocodiles.

Chitwan National Park

Nearby, Chitwan National Park चितवन राष्ट्रिय निकुञ्ज is home to one-horned rhinos, elephants, Royal Bengal tigers, crocodiles, deer and many other wild animals. It is the third largest tourist destination in Nepal after Kathmandu and Pokhara. The park has been listed in the UNESCO World Heritage List since 1983.

Narayani River
The Narayani River flows north to south in the south of Bharatpur. It is the deepest and one of the largest rivers in Nepal. The Narayani Bridge over this river connects Chitwan District with Nawalpur District of Nepal. Small islands, like Nagarban in Narayani river, are popular picnic spots.

Rapti River
The Rapti River flows east to southwest in the south of Bharatpur and meets the northern border of the Chitwan National Park.

Religious and cultural landmarks
Devghat: Devghat is a holy place for Hindus and is located in ward no. 1 on the banks of the Narayani River and the Kali River Junction. Various caves and temples of Hindu deities are located here. Devghat also holds a significant natural attraction because of the two main holy rivers.
 Tinkhole Monastery: This Lamasery was made by Buddhists as a symbol of peace, and its interior design reflects their interpretation of the meaning of life.
Ganeshthan Temple (Baseni) is the most famous Hindu temple in Bharatpur. This temple is believed to be constructed by Muni Makunda Sen, King of Palpa in the 15th century, but the modern temple was constructed in 1952 in the period of King Mahendra. This temple is located in Baseni, ward no. 11. Every Tuesday, people from different parts of the city worship Ganesha here.
Bageshwari Temple: Another ancient temple, located in ward no. 2, is believed to have been built before Muni Makunda Sen and was renovated by yogi Narahari Nath. It is located in the Devghat area development district, but the area of Bageshwari temple is also being used by Bharatpur Medical College.
Harihar Temple (Narayangadh): Harihar is another name of the Hindu deity Vishnu. This temple is on the banks of Narayani river.
 Mahakaleshwar Shiva Mandir (Bharatpur -10): The Mahakaleshwar Shiva Mandir Temple is the only temple of Shiva around this locality. This temple is made with many antiques. Along with the building itself, the temple altogether has 108 lingam, Havan Kunda, Hanuman statues, Satsang halls and Ganesha temples. Gauri Kund can also be seen in the temple periphery.
 Kalika Temple: Kalika is one of an important Hindu goddesses. This temple is located in gaindakot and is just 16 minute ride from the main bharatpur city. It is more recently constructed than the others, being built around 1992 in the top of the Hill. It is seen from most of the places of Both Gaindakot, Nawalpur and Bharatpur city.
 Jakhadi Mai Temple (Baseni): The Jakhadi Mai Temple is on the eastern corner of the jungle in ward no. 11 and was constructed in 1982 by the locals. 
 Durga Temple (Baseni): The Durga Temple was built by the police force within the compound of Bharatpur's Police Academy in 1992.
 Pashupatinath Temple (Mahendra Buspark): The Pashupatinath Temple is on the banks of the Narayani river with scenic views of Narayani and the northern Jungle of Devghat Region. It has facilities for wedding ceremonies and other religious purposes.
 Rameshwar Temple (Kchetrapur): This Mahadev temple was built in 1994. It is the busiest temple in the city and also serves people through a health post.
Children Fun Park: Located on the Torikhet village, the Children Fun Park has a swimming pool.

Forts and palaces 
 Upardanghari Fort: Located in the old headquarters of Chitwan district, it is believed to built by Satrubhanjan Shah, son of the prince Bahadur Shah, to defend the newly founded kingdom in the seventeenth century.
 Kasara Durbar (Palace) is an old palace built by Rana Regime inside the Chitwan National Park. Now, it is being used as an office of the park and hosts a museum.
 Diyalo Bangala Palace (Aptari Bharatpur): This was the spring season palace used by the Shah Dynasty of Nepal. The Diyalo Bangala Palace was built by King Mahendra to rest during the winter season. It is located on the banks of Narayani river in ward no. 2.
 DAO Building Bharatpur: This long, old building was built in the period of shifting the headquarters from Upardanghadhi. It is now used as an office of the chief district officer.
 Bharatpur Covered hall: This is a hall in the guesthouse of Bharatpur for indoor games.

Education 
Bharatpur's Chitwan Higher Secondary School is the oldest government school in Chitwan District. There are several colleges in Bharatpur, including the College of Medical Sciences, Bharatpur and Chitwan Medical College. The city's most famous institution is the Agriculture and Forestry University, which was established in 2010 and is the first technical university in Nepal.

Healthcare 
Compared to other parts of the country, Bharatpur has a highly developed healthcare system with several famous hospitals, including the second-largest government hospital in Nepal, which was established with American aid during the malaria control program operated by the US government at the request of the late King Mahendra of Nepal. B.P. Koirala Memorial Cancer Hospital was established with the help of China in 1994. 
Two medical colleges, the College of Medical Sciences and Chitwan Medical College also maintain their own teaching hospitals. Other important hospitals and nursing homes are Niko Children's Hospital, Narayani Community Hospital and Bharatpur Eye Hospital.

Transportation 

Bharatpur is located at the crossing of Mahendra Highway and Madan Ashrit Highway.

Bharatpur is the only city in Nepal that has two operating airports. Bharatpur Airport, in the central part of the city, offers daily flights to Kathmandu and to Pokhara. Meghauli Airport is a smaller airstrip in the southwest of the city.

Public transportation consists of privately run bus or microbus services. There are also frequent bus services to Kathmandu and Birgunj. Public bus service is given to the people from the city to Danda of Nawalpur District, Butwal, and other major cities and small villages and towns too.

Sports 
The Gautam Buddha International Cricket Stadium is situated in the city. The Chitwan Tigers represented the city and Chitwan as a whole in the Everest Premier League.

Media 
Eight major local FM radio stations are broadcast from Bharatpur. They are Amrit FM, Synergy FM,  Hamro FM, Radio Triveni, Radio Chitwan, Chitwan Online FM. Kalika music FM, and Kalika FM. The television stations Beso Channel, Avass TV, and Crystal TV also broadcast from Bharatpur.

Narayangarh
Narayangarh or Narayanghat (or ) is an important trading area, which is situated in the centre of Bharatpur. The major neighbourhoods of Narayangarh are Shahid Chowk, Pulchowk, Kshetrapur, Belchowk, Hakimchowk and Milanchowk. Narayangarh is famous for Taas, a spicy fried goat-meat lunch dish served with bhuja or chiura. Narayangarh has extremely hot summers but very mild winters.

Sister cities
 Yokosuka

Gallery

See also 

 2022 Bharatpur municipal election
 Jagannath Paudel

References

Populated places in Chitwan District
Metropolitan cities in Nepal
Nepal municipalities established in 1978